"Rock Hard" is a single by the Beastie Boys, released by Def Jam Records on 12" in 1984. The track contains samples from the AC/DC song "Back in Black", which was used without obtaining legal permission, causing the record to be withdrawn. Later, when the group planned to include the out-of-print song on their 1999 compilation, Beastie Boys Anthology: The Sounds of Science, AC/DC refused to allow the sample to be used. Mike D spoke to AC/DC's Malcolm Young personally on the phone when their lawyers refused to clear the sample, and later said that "AC/DC could not get with the sample concept. They were just like, 'Nothing against you guys, but we just don't endorse sampling.'"  Ad-Rock then added  "So we told them that we don't endorse people playing guitars."

The cover design is also famous for now being the official Def Jam records logo for vinyl releases; to this day, vinyl singles  released by Def Jam have this design.

Def Jam included the song on their 1987 Kick It! The Def Jam Sampler LP, released in Europe (Cat. No. KIKIT1).

Track listing

References

1984 singles
Song recordings produced by Rick Rubin
Beastie Boys songs
Songs written by Ad-Rock
Songs written by Mike D
Songs written by Adam Yauch
Songs written by Rick Rubin